Kirtivardhan Bhagwat Jha Azad (born 2 January 1959) is an Indian politician and former cricketer and who played seven Test matches and 25 One Day International for the India national cricket team between 1980 and 1986.

Azad is the son of former Chief Minister of Bihar Bhagwat Jha Azad. He was an aggressive right-hand batsman and a quickish offspinner. A surprise choice for the tour of Australia and New Zealand in 1980–81, he made his Test debut at Wellington. He was part of the Indian team that won the 1983 Cricket World Cup.

He won the 2014 Lok Sabha election for Darbhanga, Bihar. In February 2019, Kirti Azad joined Indian National Congress. He joined Trinamool Congress (TMC) after meeting TMC chief Mamta Banerjee in Delhi on Nov 23, 2021.

Domestic career

He attended Modern School in Delhi where he was part of the school cricket team. Azad, a nonconformist in many ways, was a stalwart allrounder for Delhi for many years, and in 95 Ranji Trophy matches he scored 4867 runs at an average of 47.72 and took 162 wickets at and average of 28.91. His highest score was 215 against Himachal Pradesh in 1985–86.

International career
He was a surprise choice for the tour of Australia and New Zealand in 1980–81, making his Test debut at Wellington. He then played three Tests without much success against England in 1981-82 and was later picked for the 1983 World Cup.

In his international career Azad played 7 test matches (1981–83) and 25 one-day-internationals (1980–86). Though full of potential, he couldn't take his domestic performance to the international level, scoring only 135 test runs and 269 in one-days. He picked 3 and 7 wickets in the two forms, respectively.

Politics
He followed his father Bhagwat Jha Azad, former Chief Minister of Bihar, into politics and was elected to Parliament on a Bharatiya Janata Party (BJP) ticket from Darbhanga, Bihar. He served his second term in the Lok Sabha representing Darbhanga. He was previously an MLA from Delhi's Gole Market constituency. He won the 2014 Lok Sabha Elections from Darbhanga. On 23 December 2015 he was suspended from BJP for openly targeting Union finance minister Arun Jaitley over alleged irregularities and corruption in Delhi's cricket body Delhi and District Cricket Association. Azad joined the Indian National Congress on 18 February 2019.
He fought General Election from Dhanbad Lok Sabha constituency for 2019 representing Indian National Congress, against BJP candidate Pashupati Nath Singh and lost it with a margin of 4.8 lakhs. In November 2021, Azad joined the All India Trinamool Congress ahead of the 2022 Goa Legislative Assembly election and said that he will work under Mamata Banerjee till retirement from politics.

Personal life

Azad is married to Poonam and has two sons. His elder son Suryavardhan has played for Delhi Under-17s, Under-19s and Under-22s, while his younger son Somyavardhan has played for Delhi Under-15s and Delhi Under-17s.

His wife Poonam joined Aam Aadmi Party on 13 Nov 2016, which she then quit on 11 Apr 2017 to join the Indian National Congress.Ex IPS officer and ex Information Commissioner Yashovardhan Azad is his elder brother.

Views on IPL

Following a 2012 sting operation on players of the Indian Premier League (IPL), Azad came out in opposition of the tournament and demanded that it be banned.
Speaking about the Indian T20 team, he reportedly alleged that the players played for self rather than the country. He further said that he felt agitated and ashamed to be associated with the BCCI in the wake of the IPL controversy.

In popular culture
Azad played himself in the lead role of the 2019 Indian film Kirket. The 2021 Indian film 83, which is based on India's World Cup win, featured Dinker Sharma portraying Azad's character.

References 

1959 births
India One Day International cricketers
India Test cricketers
Indian cricketers
North Zone cricketers
Delhi cricketers
Cricketers at the 1983 Cricket World Cup
Living people
India MPs 2014–2019
India MPs 2009–2014
India MPs 1999–2004
Indian sportsperson-politicians
India national cricket team selectors
Cricketers from Bihar
Delhi University alumni
Lok Sabha members from Bihar
People from Darbhanga
Indian cricket commentators
Indian National Congress politicians from Bihar
D. B. Close's XI cricketers
Trinamool Congress politicians